"Mon amour, mon ami" is a song by French singer and actress Marie Laforêt. It originally appeared on her 1967 EP Marie Laforêt vol. XIII (also known as Mon amour, mon ami).

Composition 
The song was written by André Popp and Eddy Marnay.

Track listing 
7-inch EP Marie Laforêt vol. XIII (1967, Festival FX 1531 M)
A1. "Mon amour, mon ami"
A2. "Sébastien"
B1. "Je suis folle de vous"
B2. "Mon village au fond de l'eau"

Charts 
"Mon amour, mon ami" / "Je suis folle de vous"

Covers 
In 1968 Turkish singer Gönül Yazar covered the song in Turkish as "Çapkın Kız".

The song was notably performed by Virginie Ledoyen in François Ozon's 2002 movie 8 Women and by Swedish symphonic metal band Therion in 2012.

References 

Marie Laforêt songs
1967 songs
1967 singles
Songs written by André Popp
Songs written by Eddy Marnay